Hoeppner or Höppner is a German surname. Notable people with the surname include. 

Candice Bergen (politician)/Candice Hoeppner (re-assumed her birth name of Bergen; born 1964), Canadian politician
Ernst von Höppner (1860–1922), German general
Hans Höppner (1873–1946), German botanist and entomologist
Jacob Höppner (1748–1826), Prussian Mennonite
Jake Hoeppner (1936–2015),Canadian politician
Manfred Höppner (born 1934), German sports doctor
Mareile Höppner (born 1977), German television presenter 
Michael Joseph Hoeppner (born 1949), American Roman Catholic bishop
Reinhard Höppner (1948–2014), German politician
Terry Hoeppner (1947–2007), American college football coach

See also
Hoppner (disambiguation)
Erich Hoepner